Adelaide United Football Club Youth is the youth system of Adelaide United Football Club based in Adelaide, South Australia. The team players in the National Premier Leagues, the second level of Australia's soccer pyramid in Australia. The club also competes in the under-23s A-League Youth competition.

History

Early Years (2009–2014)
The team was founded in 2008, as an Adelaide United representative team for the inaugural season of the National Youth League competition. Former Adelaide City player, Joe Mullen was appointed as head coach for Adelaide's inaugural youth squad. They finished 2nd to the qualification of the 2009 Grand Final against Sydney FC. The final result was a 2–0 loss at Hindmarsh Stadium with Adelaide finishing runners-up into both the premiership and championship.

Adelaide's top-scorer for their first two seasons was Francesco Monterosso with the first season scoring 13 goals and with the second season scoring 17 goals. This was the only back-to-back Golden Boot winner in the National Youth League.

Within the change of the NYL table format in the second National Youth League season, Adelaide United were still able to qualify for the NYL finals finishing 3rd. Adelaide United lost 1–0 to Perth Glory in the semi-final.

In the 2010–11 season, in the race for the premiership, they finished 3rd again, followed by Central Coast Mariners Youth in 2nd with Gold Coast United Youth being the premiers for the season.

National Premier Leagues entry (2014–present)
In October 2014, it was confirmed that the team would compete in the National Premier Leagues South Australia and National Premier Leagues South Australia Reserves (U20) competitions for the PS4 2015 FFSA season entering in the State League 1, the second division of South Australian football.

They gained automatic promotion in their first season to the National Premier Leagues after finishing top of the table as well as the Reserves (U20s).

In October 2015, it was announced that AUFC Youth team were to compete in the 2015 Mediterranean International Cup in Barcelona, Spain. Their first match in Group A was against Los Angeles with the result as a 4–0 victory. Then they lost 1–0 against Barcelona. This was the first game for an Adelaide United side to face Barcelona. The final game was against Palamos CF in a 3–0 victory for Adelaide.

With the final game victory, Adelaide moved on to the Round of 16 against CF Lloret. Both teams could not be split, as the full-time score was 0–0. The game was decided in a penalty shoot-out, which Adelaide United won 5–4. The Reds ended their 2015 Mediterranean International Cup, with a 4–0 loss against Malaga CF.

On 11 January 2016, Adelaide United claimed their premiership in Conference A, with Sydney FC Youth crowned Premiers for Conference B. The Grand Final was played at Central Coast Stadium with Sydney winning the grand final against Adelaide for the second season in a row between these two sides. The final result was 5–2 to Sydney FC Youth with them being 2016 National Youth League Champions.

After their successful premiership in the State League 1, they moved on to the National Premier Leagues South Australia and finished 10th which was one spot away from relegating back to the State League. In 2017, they finished the same position as 2016, finishing 10th, and still avoiding relegation. As the two unsuccessful seasons were finished, Adelaide United Youth qualified for the NPL SA Finals Series for the first time and was defeated by North Eastern MetroStars by a 1–0 scoreline in the qualifying-finals.

Players

NPL/Reserves

Current staff

Honours
NPL/Under-23s
Y-League Premiership
Runners-up (1): 2008–09

Y-League Championship
Runners-up (2): 2009, 2016

South Australian State League 1
Winners (1): 2015

Under-20s
National Premier Leagues South Australia U-20 Premiership
Winners (2): 2017, 2018

South Australian State League 1 U-20 Premiership
Winners (1): 2015

See also
 Adelaide United FC
 Adelaide United FC (W-League)

References

External links
 Official website

Adelaide United FC
Soccer clubs in Adelaide
National Premier Leagues clubs
Association football clubs established in 2008
2008 establishments in Australia
A-League National Youth League